Old Montenegro, also known as Montenegro proper, or True Montenegro, is a term used for the embryonic part of modern Montenegro. In historical context, the term designates the original territory of the Principality of Montenegro, before the territorial expansion, ratified by the Congress of Berlin in 1878, or even more precisely - the territory of the Prince-Bishopric of Montenegro prior to its unification with the region of Brda in the first half of the 19th century.

During the Ottoman period, from the 16th up to the 18th century, the original (proper) Montenegro was made up of the Montenegrin tribes, traditionally divided into four territorial units, or nahije: Katun, Rijeka, Lješanska nahija and Crmnica. Their inhabitants were known under the regional demonym Montenegrins, as opposed to the inhabitants of neighboring regions (Brđani, Hercegovci and Primorci). Since the end of the 18th century, Montenegro started to expand, incorporating the region of Brda in the first half of the 19th century, the region of Old Herzegovina and part of Primorje in 1878, and finally upper and central Polimlje and northern Metohija in 1912.

Tribes

Tribes, divided by nahija. historically, there are four nahijas in the Old Montenegro region, further divided by local tribes (clans);

See also

Anthropology
A number of toponyms and names of clans in Old Montenegro are originally derived from Albanian onomastics, such as Gjin, Gjon, Progon, Lesh, Mal and others, with some of them being: Đinov Do village in Cuce, Đinovo Brdo in Cetinje, Đinova Glavica in Pješivci, the village of Đinovići in Kosijeri, the Đonovići brotherhood in Brčeli of Crmnica, Lješanska nahija, along with its villages Liješnje, Štitari, Goljemadi and Progonovići, the village of Lješev Stup and the toponym Malošin do in Bjelice, the village of Arbanas in Ceklin.

References

Sources

 
 
 
 
 
 
 
 
 
 
 
 
 
 
 L'examen des dialectes du Vieux Monténegro (Stara Crna Gora) en tenant compte des parles voisins, Bulletin international de l' Académie polonaise des sciences et des letters N 1—3 (janvier-mars), 1–13, Cracovie 1932.

Regions of Montenegro
Prince-Bishopric of Montenegro
Principality of Montenegro
Montenegro